John of the Grating was a Cistercian Bishop of Aleth. John was born in Brittany, in 1098 he joined Clairvaux, where he was professed by St. Bernard. He would go on to found Sainte-Croix de Guingamp and Saint-Jacques de Montfort Abbeys, after his appointment as Bishop in 1144. He was given the moniker of "Grating", due to the grating, or metal rails, surrounding his shrine.

References

French Roman Catholic saints
Medieval Breton saints
12th-century Christian saints
1168 deaths
1098 births
12th-century French Roman Catholic bishops
French Cistercians
Breton beatified people
12th-century Breton people